Corbeau may refer to:

 Le Corbeau - (French for: The Raven), a 1943 French language film
 Corbeau (grape), another name for the French wine grape Douce noir
 American black vulture - or black vulture, Coragyps atratus
 Corbeau (band), Canadian rock band
 Belgian beer glassware of 1 litre
 A brand of aftermarket seating for motor vehicles.
 In Trinidad and Tobago it is the name for a turkey vulture or black vulture. A large carrion feeding bird of prey with a turkey-like bald red or black head.